Julian Knight is the former chairman and chief executive officer of climate change campaign Global Cool.

Career 

Knight joined Global Cool in October 2006 from Man Group, the world's largest alternative investment manager and financial broker. During his tenure at Man Group, Knight was in charge of global product marketing for Man Financial, and proved influential in building the organisation's Carbon Emissions Trading Programme, becoming the key adviser to the British Parliament and MEPs on global emissions trading. Prior to this, Knight was the global head of foreign exchange sales for Man Group.

Before joining Man Grooup, Knight was head of foreign exchange and global head of sales for Fimat Banque, a wholly owned derivatives subsidiary of French bank Société Générale, where he led a team responsible for producing over US$50 million of gross revenue annually, while also becoming the key architect of a number of futures and options exchanges and complex index option currency contracts for the Chicago Mercantile Exchange. He also served as one of the youngest-ever directors of the board of advisers of the New York Board of Trade.

knight lives in Hough-on-The-Hill, Lincolnshire.

Education 

Knight holds a BSc joint honours in physics and chemistry of materials from the University of Durham, and an MA in international relations from the University of Nottingham.

References

External links
GlobalCool.org

British businesspeople
Alumni of Durham University
Living people
Year of birth missing (living people)